Alimos is a south district of Athens and a municipality in South Athens regional unit, Greece. It was formed in 1968 comprising two settlements, the suburban seaside town of Kalamaki, and the inland community of Trachones. Alimos had 41,720 inhabitants in the 2011 census.

Geography

Alimos is situated on the Saronic Gulf coast, 8 km south of Athens city centre along the Athens coast. The municipality has an area of 5.909 km2. The Hellinikon Olympic Complex, built on the grounds of the former Ellinikon International Airport for the 2004 Summer Olympics, lies south of Alimos. The built-up area of Alimos is continuous with those of the neighbouring suburbs Palaio Faliro, Agios Dimitrios, Ilioupoli, Argyroupoli and Elliniko. Alimos has a large marina and several beaches.

The main roads of Alimos are Poseidonos Avenue along the coast, Kalamakiou Avenue and Alimou Avenue. The nearest subway station is at Alimos metro station, in the eastern part of the municipality. The western, coastal part of the municipality is connected with downtown Athens by the Tram.

Climate

Alimos has a hot semi-arid climate (Köppen climate classification: BSh), bordering on a hot-summer Mediterranean climate (Köppen climate classification: Csa). Alimos experiences hot, dry summers and mild, wetter winters.

Current Weather (2021-)

Weather records for 2021- in Alimos (as of 1st March 2023) are given below:

History

The first settlements uncovered by archeologists in Alimos date back to the Neolithic period, and the excavation site can be found in the region of Euonymeia (Ano Kalamaki), immediately by the Vouliagmenis Avenue.

In classical antiquity, Halimous (also Alimous, Ἀλιμοῦς) was a fishing town on the outskirts of the city-state of Athens and constituted one of the demes of Attica. The area of Ano Kalamaki, known as Euonymeia, constituted a distinct settlement, which in classical antiquity became the urban (asty) Deme of Euonymos. Testament to its development during this period are the ruins of the amphitheater of Euonymos, quite unusual in the ancient world in its rectangular design. The site can be found on Archaiou Theatrou Street in Ano Kalamaki (just a few blocks away from the Neolithic site).

The most significant historical affiliation of Alimos is that with Thucydides. Thucydides was born in Halimous, and is often referred to as "Thucydides the Halimousian" (Greek: Θουκυδίδης ο Αλιμούσιος). The bust of Thucydides is the emblem of Alimos, which is commonly used between schools in the area. Furthermore, the First High School of Alimos is called Thoukydideio (Greek: Θουκυδίδειο), after him.

Kalamaki was part of the community of Brachami until 1927, when it became a separate community. The community Kalamaki was abolished in 1968, when the municipality Alimos was founded.

Culture

Education
Alimos has public and private schools of grades, apart from higher education, in several places throughout the city. The city has 12 public kindergartens, 8 public elementary schools, 6 public Junior High Schools (including a Music School ) and 5 High Schools (including one Technical High School). Furthermore, there are several private schools, where tuition fees are needed.

Sports
Alimos has two clubs with presence in panhellenic championships, the water polo club N.O. Kalamaki with presence in A1 Ethniki and the football club Trachones F.C. with presence in Gamma Ethniki. In Alimos is located the Byzantine Sport Center that is used by the two sport clubs come from Constantinople, A.O. Tataula and A.S. Pera. These clubs settled in Alimos in 1973 and have many honours in Greek Table Tennis Championship.

Commercial activity

The commercial activity in Kalamaki or Alimos is concentrated in the major avenues that cross the city regional (Amfitheas-Poseidonos-Alimou) and the streets that are inside the city links (Thukididou-Kalamakiou-Theomitoros-Ionias-Dodekanisou).

Historical population

Many people here are the descendants of refugees from Kalkan Turkey, arriving in the Greek genocide

International relations

Alimos is twinned with:
 Niš, Serbia

References

External links
City of Alimos official website   
The Music School of Alimos  

Municipalities of Attica
Populated places in South Athens (regional unit)